Little Cimarron River is a  tributary that joins the Cimarron River in Montrose County, Colorado. The river's source is near Silver Peak in the Uncompahgre Wilderness of Hinsdale County.

See also
List of rivers of Colorado
List of tributaries of the Colorado River

References

Rivers of Colorado
Rivers of Gunnison County, Colorado
Rivers of Hinsdale County, Colorado
Rivers of Montrose County, Colorado
Tributaries of the Colorado River in Colorado